The Debtors is an American comedy film starring Michael Caine, Randy Quaid, Udo Kier, Catherine McCormack, Scott Atkinson, and Scott Wilson and directed by Evi Quaid.

The film had its world premiere at the Toronto International Film Festival in 1999. Because of legal issues the film has still not been officially released.

Plot
People with various addictions meet up at the tables in Las Vegas.

References

External links

1999 films
Unreleased American films
1999 comedy films
American comedy films
Films scored by Simon Boswell
Films set in the Las Vegas Valley
Films shot in the Las Vegas Valley
1999 directorial debut films
1990s English-language films
1990s American films